Carlo Ghigliano (8 October 1891 – 6 August 1966) was an Italian association football manager. He was a former footballer who played as a defender. On 28 March 1920, he represented the Italy national football team on the occasion of a friendly match against Switzerland in a 3–0 away loss.

References

1891 births
1966 deaths
Italian footballers
Italy international footballers
Association football defenders
Savona F.B.C. players
Genoa C.F.C. players